Shine Not Burn is a live album by Scottish-Canadian Celtic punk band The Real McKenzies, and their seventh album overall.  It was recorded in 2010 at an acoustic pub show at Wild at Heart in Berlin-Kreuzberg, Germany and released on June 22 of that year. The title is the translation of "Luceo Non Uro" which is the Chief's heraldic motto of the clan McKenzie.

Track listing
 Nessie 			
 Drink the Way I Do 			
 10,000 Shots 	
 Pickled 			
 Auld Mrs. Hunt 			
 Bastards 			
 My Bonnie 			
 Chip 			
 Scots Wha’ Ha’e 			
 Droppin’ Like Flies 			
 Pour Decisions 			
 The Skeleton and the Tailor 			
 Best Day Until Tomorrow 			
 Bitch Off the Money 			
 Get Lost 			
 Wild Mountain Thyme 			
 Whisky Scotch Whisky 			
 Sawney Beane Clan 			
 Kings o’ Glasgow 			
 Taylor Made II 			
 Bugger Off

External links 
 realmckenzies.com

2010 live albums
The Real McKenzies albums
Fat Wreck Chords albums